Zhi Hu Zhe Ye is the 1982 debut album of Taiwanese singer Lo Ta-yu.

The title of the album consists of a meaningless phrase made solely of four grammatical Chinese particles from Classical Chinese. The phrase functions as an adjective; if someone's Chinese is "Zhi hu zhe ye", it means it is stale and archaic.

The album broadened the horizons of Chinese music and set a new model for Chinese songwriting. The album had four hit singles: the title song "Zhi hu zhe ye", "Lukang, the Little Town", "Love Song 1980", and "Childhood", previously sung by Sylvia Chang in her 1981 album Childhood. The singles from the album remain among Lo Ta-yu's best known songs in mainland China.

Internationally, the album was released in 1982 as Selective Works of Lo Ta-yu by Fontana Records with two additional tracks, "Foolishly Waiting" and "Deaf-Blind".

Track listing
Side A
 "Lukang Township"
 Lukang is located in northwestern Changhua County, Taiwan
 "Love Song 1980"
 "Childhood"
 Previously sung by Sylvia Chang in her 1981 album Childhood
 "Mistake"
 "Lullaby"

Side B
 "Zhīhūzhěyě", "Archaisms" or "Semi-incomprehensible talk"
 "Nostalgia of Four Rhymes"
 "I Shall Drink Wine"
 "Story of Time"
 Previously sung by Sylvia Chang in her album Childhood
 "Dandelion"

Side A
"Childhood" 
"Love Song" 
 Alternative title of "Love Song 1980"
"Mistake" 
"Foolish Waiting"
 Originally sung by Fang Cheng in the 1981 album Merrily Big Soldiers Album by Fang Cheng and Hsu Pu-liao
"Zhi Hu Zhe Ye" 
"Lukang Township"

Side B
"Nostalgia of Four Rhymes"
"Story of Time"
"I Shall Drink Wine"
"Deaf-Blind"
 Also heard in the 1982 album Leaders of Tomorrow
"Lullaby"
 Alternative Chinese title of "Lullaby"
"Dandelion"

Reception
The book Taiwan Popular Music — 200 Best Albums (2009, enlarged from a 1994 list) by National Taiwan University (NTU) students and Ma Shih-fang, a radio DJ at News 98, ranked this album number one of their "top 20 Taiwan popular albums from 1975 to 1992".

References

1982 albums
Mandarin-language albums